Maggie Lena (née Draper Mitchell) Walker (July 15, 1864 – December 15, 1934) was an American businesswoman and teacher. In 1903, Walker became both the first African American woman to charter a bank and the first African American woman to serve as a bank president. As a leader, Walker achieved successes with the vision to make tangible improvements in the way of life for African Americans. Disabled by paralysis and a wheelchair user later in life, Walker also became an example for people with disabilities.

Walker's restored and furnished home in the historic Jackson Ward neighborhood of Richmond, Virginia has been designated a National Historic Site, operated by the National Park Service.

Childhood 
Maggie Lena Draper was born on July 15, 1864, the daughter of Elizabeth Draper and Eccles Cuthbert. Her mother, a former slave, was an assistant cook at the Van Lew estate in Church Hill  of Richmond, Virginia, where she met Cuthbert, an Irish American journalist for the New York Herald, based in Virginia. There is no record of a marriage between Draper and Cuthbert. Draper was employed by Elizabeth Van Lew, who had been a spy for the Union during the Civil War (1861–1865) in the Confederate capital city of Richmond. Draper married William Mitchell, a butler at the Van Lew estate, soon after Walker's birth. In 1870, Johnnie Mitchell was born to her mother and stepfather.

After William Mitchell became headwaiter at the Saint Charles Hotel, the Mitchell family moved to their own home on College Alley off of Broad Street nearby Miss Van Lew's home where Walker and her half-brother Johnnie were raised. The house was near the First African Baptist Church which, like many black churches at the time, was an economic, political, and social center for the local black community. After the untimely death of William Mitchell, Walker's mother supported her family by working as a laundress. Walker attended the newly formed Richmond Public Schools and helped her mother by delivering clean clothes.

When she was fourteen years old, Walker joined the local council of the Independent Order of St. Luke. This fraternal burial society, established in 1867 in Baltimore, Maryland, ministered to the sick and aged, promoted humanitarian causes, and encouraged individual self-help and integrity.

Teaching career 
After graduating from the Richmond Colored Normal School in 1883, she taught for three years at her former school, the Valley School, also known as the Lancasterian School. Her employment ended once she was married, in accordance with school policy against employing married women.

Independent Order of St. Luke 

After leaving her teaching position in 1886, Walker devoted herself to the Order and rose steadily through its ranks. She served in numerous capacities of increasing responsibility for the Order, from that of a delegate to the biannual convention to the top leadership position of Right Worthy Grand Secretary in 1899. Walker's social change activities with the Independent Order of St. Luke demonstrated her keen consciousness of oppression and her dedication to challenge racial and gender injustice.

A pioneering insurance executive, financier and civic icon, she established the Juvenile Branch of the Order in 1895 while serving as grand deputy matron. This branch encouraged education, community service, and thrift in young members.

Establishment of the St. Luke Penny Savings Bank 
In 1902, she published a newspaper for the organization, The St. Luke Herald.  Shortly after, she chartered the St. Luke Penny Savings Bank. Walker served as the bank's first president, which earned her the recognition of being the first African American woman to charter a bank in the United States. Charles Thaddeus Russell was Richmond's first black architect and he designed the building for Walker. The St. Luke Penny Savings Bank's leadership also included several female board members. Later Walker agreed to serve as chairman of the board of directors when the bank merged with two other Richmond banks to become The Consolidated Bank and Trust Company, which grew to serve generations of Richmonders as an African-American owned institution.

Personal life 
On September 14, 1886, in Richmond, she married Armstead Walker Jr. (1860–1915), a brick contractor. They adopted a daughter, Polly Anderson, and had three sons: Russell Eccles Talmadge Walker born in 1890; Armstead Mitchell Walker born in 1893, but died seven months later; and Melvin DeWitt Walker who was born in 1897. The Walkers purchased a home in 1904 at 110 East Leigh Street, within the African American Jackson Ward neighborhood of Richmond. It was enlarged over the years to accommodate their children's families.

On June 20, 1914, Walker's son, Russell Walker, at age , shot and killed his father, Armstead, having mistaken him for a burglar, for whom both he and his father had been searching. Russell was arrested and charged with murder and, after five months awaiting trial, was declared innocent. The loss left Walker to manage a large household. Her work and investments kept the family comfortably situated.

Russell, however, never recovered from the incident and after eight years battling depression and alcoholism, died November 23, 1923.

Walker was inducted as an Honorary Member of the Nu Chapter of Zeta Phi Beta sorority at the chapter's first meeting in 1926.

Legacy 

In 1905, Walker was featured alongside other African American leaders, such as Mary Church Terrell, T. Thomas Fortune, and George Washington Carver in a poster titled, "101 Prominent Colored People".

Walker received an honorary master's degree from Virginia Union University in 1925, and was inducted into the Junior Achievement U.S. Business Hall of Fame in 2001.

In Walker's honor Richmond Public Schools built a large brick high school adjacent to Virginia Union University. Maggie L. Walker High School was one of two schools in the area for black students during the Jim Crow era; the other was Armstrong High School. Generations of students spent their high-school years at the school. It was totally refurbished to reopen in 2001 as the regional Maggie L. Walker Governor's School for Government and International Studies.

The St. Luke Building held the offices of the Independent Order of St. Luke, and the office of Maggie L. Walker.  As late as 1981, Walker's office was being preserved as it was at the time of her death in 1934. The building was listed on the National Register of Historic Places in 1982.

The National Park Service operates the Maggie L. Walker National Historic Site at her former Jackson Ward home. In 1978 the house was designated a National Historic Site and was opened as a museum in 1985. The site states that it "commemorates the life of a progressive and talented African-American woman. She achieved success in the world of business and finance as the first woman in the United States to charter and serve as president of a bank, despite the many adversities. The site includes a visitor center detailing her life and the Jackson Ward community in which she lived and worked and her residence of thirty years. The house is restored to its 1930s appearance with original Walker family pieces."

The National Park Service summarizes Walker's legacy with the statement, "Through her guidance of the Independent Order of St. Luke, Walker demonstrated that African American men and women could be leaders in business, politics, and education during a time when society insisted on the contrary."

Walker was honored as one of the first group of Virginia Women in History in 2000.

On July 15, 2017, a statue of Walker, designed by Antonio Tobias Mendez, was unveiled at the Maggie L. Walker Memorial Plaza on Broad Street in Richmond. The bronze, 10-foot statue shows a depiction of how she lived, with her glasses pinned to her lapel and a checkbook in hand.

In 2020, Walker was one of eight women featured in "The Only One in the Room" display at the Smithsonian National Museum of American History.

Notes

References

Further reading

External links 

NPS Maggie L. Walker National Historic Site website
Maggie L. Walker National Historic Site Museum Online Collections
Maggie L. Walker Videos on Youtube
Maggie L. Walker Governor's School for Government and International Studies website
Enterprising Women Maggie L. Walker Archived webpage from June 17, 2006
Norwood, Arlisha. "Maggie Walker". National Women's History Museum. 2017.

1867 births
1934 deaths
People from Richmond, Virginia
American bankers
Businesspeople from Richmond, Virginia
African-American activists
African-American history of Virginia
American women bankers
African-American bankers
African-American founders
American founders
Women founders
American women business executives
American business executives
19th-century American businesspeople
20th-century American businesspeople
Activists from Virginia
20th-century American businesswomen
19th-century American businesswomen
20th-century African-American women
20th-century African-American people